Havelock High School is a public high school located in Havelock, North Carolina, founded in 1956. Havelock is one of three high schools operated by the Craven County School District.

The original campus is now the site of Havelock Middle School, and the current campus was built in 1971, although it has been expanded several times since. Serving grades 9–12, the school is one of three high schools in the Craven County Schools district. Students who attend Havelock High are living in the areas of Havelock, MCAS Cherry Point and Harlowe, with some students occasionally living in neighboring New Bern or James City.  

The past principal of the school has been Jeff Murphy since 2005 although he retired in 2019, and the current principal is Stacie Friebel.

Athletics
Havelock High School offers a wide range of athletics including football, basketball, baseball, softball, swimming, etc. They are members of the 3A Coastal Conference. The mascot of the high school is the ram and the colors are black and white, while gold and silver are tertiary and quaternary. Havelock High School's rivals include New Bern High School and West Craven High School.

The football team won three consecutive North Carolina High School Athletic Association (NCHSAA) 3A State Championships in 2011, 2012, and 2013.

Notable alumni
 Kendal Vickers, American Football NFL Defensive Lineman with the Las Vegas Raiders 
 Ky Bowman, NBA player for the Golden State Warriors
 Bruce Carter, NFL linebacker
 Pharoh Cooper, NFL wide receiver and return specialist
 William M. Faulkner, United States Marine Corps Lieutenant General
 Linda McMahon, former professional wrestling executive and former government official serving as the Administrator of the Small Business Administration
 Corey Robinson, NFL offensive tackle
 Guy Whimper, former NFL offensive tackle and Super Bowl XLII champion with the New York Giants

References

External links 
 Havelock High School
 Havelock Rams Reunion Network
 Havelock High School band

Public high schools in North Carolina
Schools in Craven County, North Carolina